Mapex Drums (Music And Percussion EXcellence) is a Taiwanese brand of musical instruments established by KHS Musical Instruments in 1989. Instruments manufactured with the "Mapex" name include drum kits and hardware.

Products 

Mapex produces seven different lines of drums: the introductory "Voyager" and "Horizon" series, the intermediate "Meridian Birch" and "Meridian Maple", and the professional level "Saturn" and "Orion". In years past the V and Pro M series were called the Venus and Mars series, in keeping with the tradition of naming the kits after planets. However, the quality of these series have changed since they abandoned the old names. For a brief time, Mapex also offered the "Deep Forest" line of drums, built entirely out of Walnut or Cherry plies, as well as the Aquiles Priester signature drum kit.Aquiles Priester - Hangar, Freakeys on Mapex website (archive) 2 January 2010</ref>

Mapex has been also associated with "Falcon" pedals, "Black Panther" snare drums and kits, and "Tornado" starter kits.

Drum kits

Voyager and Horizon 
In January 2010, the Q and QR series were no longer made, having been replaced by the new Voyager series, while the Horizon series replaced the VX series (VXB for Britain). These entry-level, yet highly regarded kits have improved their lugs, mounts, badges and bass drum claws. The "Horizon HZ" kit offers a newly mixed birch/basswood drum shell. A newly available Mapex cymbal pack is optional with any of these kits.

Mapex M and Meridian Birch
As of early 2009, Mapex has replaced the very popular M Birch and Pro-M drums series, with the Meridian Birch and Meridian Maple series respectively. These are considered to be intermediate/semi-pro lines of drums. The Meridian Maple series feature 7-ply, 5.8mm, all maple shells (7.2mm bass drum). They also feature Mapex 2.3mm Steel Powerhoops and Remo UT Pinstripe batter heads along with Spring Loaded Floor Tom Legs (from the higher end Saturn & Orion lines). The Meridian Birch features 6-ply, 7.2mm, all birch shells, and also feature Remo UT heads, but not the 2.3mm Powerhoops nor the Spring Cushioned Floor Tom Legs. The hoops on the Birch line (1.6mm) and the floor tom legs are considerably thinner. It is a common misconception among customers (even among some Mapex retailers) that these two lines of drums are similar and share the same features. The Maple line has several higher end features taken from the previous Pro-M line and the Birch line carries forward the M-Birch features. In 2004 the M series and Pro M series Mapex drums were both constructed with maple shells. In 2005 the M series Mapex drum changed to Birch shells, the Pro M continued to carry foreword the North American maple shells, both these shell distinctions remained through 2008. In 2009 the two lines were renamed Meridian Maple and Meridian birch to clear up the long held confusion that M indicated Maple, as the initial M series was made with Maple shells. The Meridian series are Mapex's most popular series of drums.

MyDentity 
Following the popularity of the Meridian line, Mapex launched –only for the USA market as of 2013– the "MyDentity" line of custom ordered intermediate/semi-pro drums. This level of customization is usually only found in high-end drum lines.

Saturn

The Saturn line is constructed of maple and walnut (the oldest lines were made of basswood or mahogany instead of walnut). The kit is constructed of 6 plies of wood for a shell thickness of 5.1 millimeters.  It shares a number of options with both the Mars and Orion line, but is not available with birdseye maple plies. Saturn kits come in a variety of lacquer and wrap finishes (including bursts, sparkles and fades) and come with the option of black or chrome hardware. The Saturn has become very popular, as the thinner hybrid shells provide a lower/warmer/darker fundamental tone than similar all-maple shells. Although they are priced as midrange drums, they are considered a fully professional kit and used by recording artists such as Chris Adler from Lamb of God, who recently switched over to the new Black Panther line of drums. During 2011 and 2012 Mapex also offered the Saturn LE (Limited Edition) and Saturn SE (Special Edition) Birch/Walnut kits. Mapex built 100 Limited Edition kits only, and a limited number of the SE kits as well. According to the Mapex site as of March 2013, the Special Edition Saturn Birch/Walnut was an extension and addition to the distinctive Saturn sound. Mapex had taken the rich sonic characteristics of walnut and combined them with the bright and articulate punch of birch. The result is a drum shell that projects a fusion of depth and clarity. The five-piece shell pack was available in Ocean Wave Fade, Moss Green, Wine Burst, or Walnut Fade over Figured Maple and is appointed with smoky black hardware. The relative rarity of the LE and SE kits is increasing their value and they are considered by some to be the finest Saturn kits ever made.

Mapex has since released the Saturn IV line in 2014 and the Saturn V line in 2015. Along with several new shell finishes, these new lines of Saturn feature a new tom mount isolation system called Soniclear The primary change from Saturn IV to Saturn V is the addition of Mapex's Soniclear Bearing Edge, introduced previously on lower lines, including MyDentity, Armory and Mars Kits. This new edge allows the drumhead to sit flatter and brings out an improved response by optimizing the relationship between head and shell.

Orion
The Orion Series is an all-maple 6.1 millimetre 7-ply setup with an outer layer of Birdseye maple as an option. It is Mapex's flagship series and is also the most versatile kit available from Mapex as each kit can only be ordered by components. No preconfigured kits are available. It is available with Chrome, Black Nickel and 24-kt. gold-plated hardware.

For the duration of 2005 the Orion's inner "plies" were identical to the all-maple Pro-M's inner plies, the difference being the outer "finish" ply. The Orion received Mapex's figured birdseye maple or other such exotic wood finishes, while the Pro-M received regular North American maple finish ply. With the exception of the 15th Anniversary edition Pro-M with a production run of 300 worldwide, this set was given the figured Birdseye Maple finish of the Orion in Autumn or Jade Fade.

The overall shell thicknesses for both the Orion and the early Pro-Ms of 2005 - 2006 were identical at 6.1 mm. This was the case only till early 2006 when production changed at the factory in Tianjin. All Pro-Ms received a changed ply configuration and thickness resulting in an overall shell thickness of 5.8mm, and the Orion kept its 6.1 mm shell thickness. The Orions are actually priced lower than most of their high-end market competition. The exotic burl finish is not common with other high-end drum companies at the same price point.
As of early 2012 the Orion line was discontinued. At the same time a Saturn SE (Special Edition) series of Birch/Walnut was introduced. This left the Black Panther kits as the top Mapex line available.

Black Panther

Building on the foundations of the very successful Black Panther line of snares, Mapex introduced limited editions of drumkits based on those snares. As of April 2013, four models were produced: the Blaster, the Velvetone, the Retrosonic and the Black Widow. In late 2015/early 2016, a white version of the 'Black Widow' kit called the 'White Widow' was introduced, the shell color being the only differentiating factor between the two kits.

Drumheads 

Mapex kits also come with Remo drumheads. All of the drums below Saturn come with the UT series, which are made in the Remo factory in China. They were made using the same Dupont Mylar film as is used on the Remo USA Weatherking head. The difference is in the construction of the head. Whereas the US heads were made using a poured channel technique, the China heads were crimped. The aluminium hoop was folded over a steel ring that is inserted in the U-channel to hold the film in place. Starting in 2007, Saturns and Orions came with Remo Emperor heads on the toms and clear Ambassadors for the resonant heads. This was put in place to showcase the full sonic capabilities of the drums right when they are in stores.

See also
 KHS Musical Instruments

References

External links

 

1989 establishments in Taiwan
Percussion instrument manufacturing companies
Companies based in Taipei
Companies established in 1989
Taiwanese brands
Musical instrument manufacturing companies of Taiwan